The 1963–64 New Zealand tour of Britain, Ireland and France was a rugby union tour undertaken by the New Zealand national rugby union team. The tour took in the five major Northern Hemisphere rugby nations of England, Scotland, Ireland, Wales and France. The tour also took in matches against club opposition and invitational county teams, ending in Europe with an encounter with the Barbarians. The final two games of the tour were played in Canada.

The New Zealand team were nearly invincible on this tour, their only defeat coming at Newport. They played 36 matches in total, winning 34, losing one and drawing one. They won four of their five international matches, being prevented from completing a clean sweep by a 0–0 draw in the match against Scotland.

Matches
Scores and results list New Zealand's points tally first.

Touring party

Manager: F. D. Kilby
Assistant Manager: Neil McPhail
Captain: Wilson Whineray

Backs
Don Clarke (Waikato)
Malcolm Dick (Auckland)
Ian MacRae (Hawke's Bay)
Earle Kirton (Otago)
Ralph Caulton (Wellington)
Bill Davis (Hawke's Bay)
Ian Smith (Otago)
Paul Little (Auckland)
Derek Arnold (Canterbury)
Pat Walsh (Counties)
Mack Herewini (Auckland)
Bruce Watt (Canterbury)
Kevin Briscoe (Taranaki)
Chris Laidlaw (Otago)

Forwards
Wilson Whineray (Auckland)
John Major (Taranaki)
Jules Le Lievre (Canterbury)
Allan Stewart (Canterbury)
Ron Horsley (Manawatu)
Kel Tremain (Hawke's Bay)
Brian Lochore (Wairarapa)
Keith Nelson (Otago)
Colin Meads (King Country)
Ken Gray (Wellington)
Ian Clarke (Waikato)
Dennis Young (Canterbury)
Stanley Meads (King Country)
Kevin Barry (Thames Valley)
John Graham (Canterbury)
Waka Nathan (Auckland)

References

External links
 1963–64 Tour in Details

1963 rugby union tours
1964 rugby union tours
1963 in New Zealand rugby union
1964 in New Zealand rugby union
1963-64
1963-64
1963-64
1963-64
1963-64
1963-64
1963-64
1963-64
1963–64 in English rugby union
1963–64 in Welsh rugby union
1963–64 in Scottish rugby union
1963–64 in French rugby union
1964 in Canadian rugby union
1963–64 in Irish rugby union